Vojtěch Hruban (born 29 August 1989) is a Czech basketball player for the London Lions of the British Basketball League (BBL). He also represents the Czech Republic national team. With 996 career points, he is the all-time scoring leader of the Basketball Champions League.

Professional career 
Hruban started his career in 2006 with Slavia Prague in the Czech NBL. In 2012, he signed with Nymburk where he stayed for 10 seasons in which they won the NBL championship every year.

In July 2022, Hruban signed with the London Lions of the British Basketball League.

National team career
Hruban represented the Czech Republic at the EuroBasket in 2015 and 2017. He was also chosen to play for the team at the 2019 FIBA World Cup.

References

1989 births
Living people
2019 FIBA Basketball World Cup players
Basketball Nymburk players
Czech men's basketball players
Small forwards
Sportspeople from Prague
USK Praha players
21st-century Czech people